Actin filament-associated protein 1 is a protein that in humans is encoded by the AFAP1 gene.

The protein encoded by this gene is a Src binding partner. It may represent a potential modulator of actin filament integrity in response to cellular signals, and may function as an adaptor protein by linking Src family members and/or other signaling proteins to actin filaments. Two alternative transcripts encoding the same protein have been identified.

References

External links

Further reading